Hannu Petteri Lintu (born 13 October 1967) is a Finnish conductor.

Biography
Lintu was born in Rauma. He studied piano and cello at the Turku Conservatory and at the Sibelius Academy.  He also studied conducting with Atso Almila, and later with Jorma Panula and Eri Klas.  He took part in conducting master classes with Ilya Musin.  Lintu won the Nordic Conducting Competition in 1994 in Bergen.  He graduated from the Sibelius Academy in 1996 with honours.  Lintu took up a part-time appointment of professor of conducting at the Sibelius Academy in September 2014.

From 1998 to 2001, Lintu was chief conductor of the Turku Philharmonic Orchestra.  In 2005, he served as the artistic director for the Summer Sounds Festival of the Finnish contemporary music ensemble Avanti!.  Lintu was chief conductor of the Tampere Philharmonic Orchestra from 2009 to 2013.  In December 2010, the Finnish Radio Symphony Orchestra announced the appointment of Lintu as its eighth chief conductor, effective 1 August 2013, with an initial contract of three seasons.  He held the title of principal guest conductor with the orchestra for the 2012–2013 season.  In April 2016, the FRSO announced the extension of Lintu's contract as chief conductor through 2021.  Lintu stood down as chief conductor of the orchestra at the close of the 2020–2021 season.  In May 2019, Finnish National Opera and Ballet announced the appointment of Lintu as its next chief conductor, with a contract effective from 1 January 2022 to 30 June 2026.  His chief conductorship of Finnish National Opera and Ballet formally began in August 2021. 

Outside Finland, Lintu was chief conductor and artistic director of the Helsingborg Symphony Orchestra from 2002 to 2005. Lintu first conducted Ireland's RTÉ National Symphony Orchestra in January 2009.  On the basis of that appearance, he was named principal guest conductor of the RTÉ National Symphony Orchestra, effective with the 2010-2011 season.  He held this RTÉ post through May 2013.  In November 2022, the Gulbenkian Orchestra announced the appointment of Lintu as its next chief conductor, effective with the 2023-2024 season.

Lintu resides in Helsinki.  He has conducted commercial recordings for such labels as Claves, Dacapo, Danacord, Hyperion, Naxos, and Ondine.

References

External links
 Official Hannu Lintu homepage
 HarrisonParrott agency biography of Hannu Lintu
 ClassicsToday.com review of Dacapo- 6.220511 

 
 
 
 

1967 births
Living people
Finnish conductors (music)
Sibelius Academy alumni
Finnish gay musicians
21st-century conductors (music)